Out of the Cradle is the third solo album by American singer/songwriter  Lindsey Buckingham. Released in 1992, it was Buckingham's first album after his departure from Fleetwood Mac, in 1987 (though Buckingham rejoined the band in 1997).  He named the album after Walt Whitman's poem "Out of the Cradle Endlessly Rocking." The album reached #128 on the US Billboard 200 album chart, #51 on the UK Albums Chart, and #70 on the Canada Albums Chart. In Canada, four singles charted within the Top 60.

Allmusic writes that along with Michael Nesmith's Tropical Campfires, this album may be one of the finest and most underrated albums of the 1990s.

Ten of the songs on the album (counting "Instrumental Introduction To") were included on Solo Anthology: The Best of Lindsey Buckingham.

Production
Richard Dashut, who worked with Buckingham on many Fleetwood Mac albums, helped co-produce and co-write much of the material on Out of the Cradle. The album was recorded at Buckingham's home studio.

Out of the Cradle contains multiple instrumental introductions to songs. The album includes two covers: "All My Sorrows" and "This Nearly Was Mine".

Critical reception
The Los Angeles Times wrote that "it’s impossible to miss the meaning of Out of the Cradle: the primacy of the guitar as an expressive instrument." The Rolling Stone Album Guide thought that "one catchy song after song, the sonic details flesh out the deceptively simple melodies." The Washington Post declared: "The album's stories are told with music, and only Brian Wilson, Stevie Wonder, Paul McCartney and a handful of others have made rock-and-roll as rich and powerful as this." Of "Say We'll Meet Again", Magnet wrote that "Buckingham’s Beach Boys/Les Paul & Mary Ford fascination manifests itself on this spare and breezy ballad, which closes Out Of The Cradle in most gentle fashion."

Track listing
All tracks written by Lindsey Buckingham and Richard Dashut except where noted.

Personnel 
Main Performer
 Lindsey Buckingham – vocals, guitars, keyboards, synthesizers, bass, drums, percussion, drum and percussion programming

Additional personnel
 Mitchell Froom – organ (14)
 Larry Klein – bass (3, 4, 8, 12)
 Buell Neidlinger – bass (5, 10)
 Alex Acuña – percussion (2, 4, 5, 9, 12)

Production 
 Lindsey Buckingham – producer, recording, Polaroid art
 Richard Dashut – producer, recording, Polaroid art
 Greg Droman – recording 
 Kevin Killen – recording 
 Eric Rudd – recording assistant 
 Chris Lord-Alge – mixing 
 Lori Fumar – mix assistant 
 Talley Sherwood – mix assistant 
 Bob Ludwig – mastering 
 Masterdisk (New York City, New York) – mastering location 
 Andy Engel – package design 
 Greg Gorman – photography 
 Ron Slenzak – photography 
 Guzman – photography
 Walter Egan – woodcuts
 Michael Brokaw Management – management

Format
The album was released on Cassette, CD and in some countries on Vinyl LP.

Singles

Music promo videos
Four promotional music videos were shot for Out of the Cradle: "Wrong," "Countdown," "Soul Drifter," and "Don't Look Down." As of 2019, Lindsey Buckingham has released all four of these videos to his official YouTube Channel.

References

Lindsey Buckingham albums
1992 albums
Albums produced by Richard Dashut
Albums produced by Lindsey Buckingham
Reprise Records albums
Song recordings produced by Richard Dashut
Albums recorded in a home studio